Standings and Results for Group B of the Regular Season phase of the 2007-08 Euroleague basketball tournament.

Main page: Euroleague 2007-08

Standings

Lietuvos Rytas take first place over Maccabi by virtue of a head-to-head sweep.

Fixtures and results

All times given below are in Central European Time.

Game 1
October 24–25, 2007

Game 2
October 31 - November 1, 2007

Game 3
November 7–8, 2007

Game 4
November 14–15, 2007

Game 5
November 21–22, 2007

Game 6
November 28–29, 2007

Game 7
December 5–6, 2007

Game 8
December 12–13, 2007

Game 9
December 19–20, 2007

Game 10
January 2–3, 2008

Game 11
January 9–10, 2008

Game 12
January 16–17, 2008

Game 13
January 23–24, 2008

Game 14
January 31, 2008

2007–08 Euroleague